Nokdu Flower is a 2019 South Korean television series starring Jo Jung-suk, Yoon Shi-yoon and Han Ye-ri. It aired from April 26 to July 13, 2019 on SBS TV.

Synopsis
The series tells the story of two half-brothers from separate mothers but share the same father who experienced different upbringings due to their respective mothers' different social statuses. The brothers find themselves fighting on the opposite sides of the Battle of Ugeumchi, which took place in 1894 during the Donghak Peasant Revolution. Their relationship is tested as both find themselves questioning their loyalties and values.

Cast

Main
 Jo Jung-suk as Baek Yi-kang, the illegitimate older son who was born out of wedlock as the son of his father's wife's handmaid and is discriminated against by his family due to his mother's low status.
 Park Sang-hoon as young Baek Yi-kang
 Yoon Shi-yoon as Baek Yi-hyun, the legitimate younger son who received an elite education in Japan and is preparing for the national civil service exam.
 Han Ye-ri as Song Ja-in, a daughter of an elite family who is charismatic and strong-minded. She also runs a shop where she trades goods for money.

Supporting
 Park Hyuk-kwon as Baek Ga, Yi-kang and Yi-hyun's father who is a notorious and wealthy government official in the town of Gobu. He is greedy for reputation due to his inferiority complex about his low birth.
 Min Sung-wook as Choi Kyung-seon, Yi-kang's ally who is the commander of the vanguard unit of a rebel army.
 Choi Moo-sung as Jeon Bongjun, the owner of a local apothecary who becomes the revolutionary leader.
 Kim Sang-ho as Choi Deok-gi
 Choi Won-young as Hwang Seok-ju 
 Jo Hyun-sik as Eok-soe
 Park Gyu-young as Hwang Myung-shim
 Byung Hun as Beon Gae
 Shim Wan-joon as Jae-yun
 Noh Haeng-ha as Beo-deul, sniper and Kyung Seon's unit.
 Ahn Gil-kang as Hae Seung, monk and Kyung Seon's unit.
 Seo Young-hee as Yoo Wol, Yi-kang's mother.
 Hwang Young-hee as Chae Jung-shil, Yi-hyun's mother.
 Baek Eun-hye as Baek Yi-hwa, Yi-hyun's sister.
 Moon Won-joo as Kim Dang-son, Yi-hwa's husband.
 Park Ji-il as Song Bong-gil
 Park Ji-hwan as Kim Ga
 Son Woo-hyeon as Lee Kyu-tae

Special appearance
 Park Hoon as Kim Chang-soo, Donghak leader. (Ep. 48)

Production
Early working title of the series is Ugeumchi.

Ratings

Awards and nominations

Notes

References

External links
  
 
 

Seoul Broadcasting System television dramas
Korean-language television shows
2019 South Korean television series debuts
2019 South Korean television series endings
South Korean historical television series
Television series by C-JeS Entertainment